Wolf's Clothing is a 1927 American comedy film directed by Roy Del Ruth and written by Darryl F. Zanuck. The film stars Monte Blue, Patsy Ruth Miller, John Miljan, Douglas Gerrard, Lew Harvey and Ethan Laidlaw. The film was released by Warner Bros. on January 15, 1927.

Cast       
Monte Blue as Barry Baline
Patsy Ruth Miller as Minnie Humphrey
John Miljan as Johnson Craigie
Douglas Gerrard as Herbert Candish
Lew Harvey as Vanelli
Ethan Laidlaw as Vanelli's Pal
J.C. Fowler as Hotel Manager
Walter Rodgers as Hotel Doctor
Arthur Millett as Hotel Detective
John Webb Dillion as Crook 'Doctor' 
Lee Moran as Millionaire
Paul Panzer as Tough
Charles Haefeli as Tough
Jack Cooper as Tough
Kalla Pasha as Ship Captain
Jack Curtis as Sailor
Eddie Sturgis as Sailor

Preservation status
The film is lost.

References

External links
 
 

1927 films
1920s English-language films
Silent American comedy films
1927 comedy films
Warner Bros. films
Films directed by Roy Del Ruth
American silent feature films
American black-and-white films
1920s American films